Failed States is the sixth full-length album by the punk rock band Propagandhi. It was released on September 4, 2012, receiving critical praise.

A remastered version was released through multiple digital streaming services on February 1, 2019 as Chris Hannah felt that the original version sounded inferior to the quality of Supporting Caste and Victory Lap.

Track listing

Critical and commercial reception
The album debuted at number 1 on the Heatseekers chart for one week, and number 107 on the Billboard 200 with first-week sales of 3,500 copies.

Personnel

Propagandhi
Chris Hannah - guitar, vocals
Jord Samolesky - drums
Todd Kowalski - bass guitar, vocals
David Guillas - guitar

Artwork
 Cover painting by Todd Kowalski
 Booklet cover painting by Charlie Immer
 Challenger explosion photo by NASA
 Band photo by Mandy Malazdrewich
 Layout by Derek Hogue/Amphibian

Production
John Paul Peters - producer, engineer
Troy Glessner - mastering

References

External links

2012 albums
Propagandhi albums
Epitaph Records albums